Slabtown is an unincorporated community in Marion Township, Decatur County, Indiana.

History
Slabs used to lay plank roads were manufactured here, hence the name.

Geography

References

Unincorporated communities in Decatur County, Indiana
Unincorporated communities in Indiana